The Men's sprint competition at the 2020 UCI Track Cycling World Championships was held on 29 February and 1 March 2020.

Results

Qualifying
The qualifying was started on 29 February at 11:25. The top four riders advanced directly to the 1/8 finals; places 5 to 28 advanced to the 1/16 finals.

1/16 finals
The 1/16 finals were started on 29 February at 12.35. Heat winners advanced to the 1/8 finals.

1/8 finals
The 1/8 finalswere started on 29 February at 14:16. Heat winners advanced to the quarterfinals.

Quarterfinals
The quarterfinals were started on 29 February at 16:52. Matches are extended to a best-of-three format hereon; winners proceed to the semifinals.

Semifinals
The semifinals were started on 1 March at 11:00.

Finals
The finals were started on 1 March at 14:39.

References

Men's sprint
UCI Track Cycling World Championships – Men's sprint